Ravivar Loksatta is a Marathi weekly newspaper published in India which is one of the highest circulated weekly newspapers in India. It is published by Indian Express Limited in Mumbai, Nagpur, Pune and Ahmedabad. It is registered in Registrar of Newspapers for India.

Circulation 

 2012 - 363,006
 2013 - 364,723
 2016 - 401,862
 2017 - 399,928
 2018 - 364,033
 2019 - 353,522

References 

Newspapers published in India
Weekly newspapers published in India
Newspapers published in Maharashtra
Marathi-language newspapers